Yemassee may refer to:

Yamasee, a Native American people
Yemassee, South Carolina
Yemassee (journal), a literary journal
The Yemassee, an 1835 novel by William Gilmore Simms